Tytthoscincus textus is a species of skink. It is endemic to Indonesia.

References

textus
Endemic fauna of Indonesia
Reptiles of Indonesia
Reptiles described in 1894
Taxa named by Fritz Müller (doctor)